Margot Benacerraf (born August 14, 1926) is a Venezuelan director of Moroccan Jewish descent. Benacerraf was one of the first Latin American filmmakers to study at IDHEC (Institut des hautes études cinématographiques) in Paris.

Work
Benacerraf's two best known films, the 1950s documentaries Reverón and Araya, are considered "landmarks of Latin America narrative non-fiction".  Reverón illustrates the life of the well-known Venezuelan painter Armando Reverón. Araya portrays the day-to-day work of the workers of the salt mines of Araya, a village in the east of Venezuela.  The film was entered into the 1959 Cannes Film Festival, where it shared the Cannes International Critics Prize with Alain Resnais's Hiroshima mon amour.

Benacerraf founded the Nacional Film Library in 1966 and was its director for three years consecutively. She was a member of the board of directors of Ateneo de Caracas, and in 1991, with the help of the writer and patron of the Latin American cinema Gabriel García Márquez, created Latin Fundavisual, the foundation in charge of promoting Latin American audio-visual art in Venezuela.

Awards 
She has received several decorations among them National Prize of Cinema (1995), the Order Andrés Bello (in two occasions), the Order Simón Bolivar, Order of the Italian Government, Bernardo O’Higgins Order of the Government of Chile, among others. In February 1987, Ateneo de Caracas inaugurated a movie theater named after her. In 2019, the Venezuelan American Endowment for the Arts (VAEA) awarded Benacerraf the Paez Medal of Art 2019 for her life work.

Filmography 

 Reverón (1952)
 Araya (1959)

References

External links

IONCINEMA.com Interview with Margot Benacerraf

1926 births
Living people
Venezuelan women film directors
People from Caracas
Venezuelan people of Moroccan-Jewish descent
20th-century Moroccan Jews